Charles Southwood  was an American actor in Europe and the founder of Death Cigarettes.

Biography
Southwood is connected with Spaghetti Westerns.

Born in Los Angeles in 1937, his family moved to Oregon at the end of World War II.  He earned a degree in philosophy at Oregon State University.

He travelled to Europe where he worked at a variety of jobs before becoming a stand in for Lex Barker on Woman Times Seven in 1966.  He was spotted by an agent who led him into lead roles in Spaghetti Westerns.

Death Cigarettes
Southwood founded Death Cigarettes for "truth-in-advertising".

Returning to Oregon, he came up with the idea of "Death Cigarettes" in 1991.  Deciding to be honest about the effect of cigarettes, Southwood, a smoker from age 13 to 40, decided to be brutally honest about his cigarettes. In addition to the standard warnings, Death Cigarettes were packed in their own coffin: a stark little black package bearing a skull and crossbones.  Southwood traveled to the Southern United States, where the major U.S. tobacco companies found his idea "antithetical to their interests." He found a small tobacco company in Holland that was willing to manufacture his cigarettes, and he briefly took up smoking again to get the blend of tobaccos just right, however he couldn't find a cigarette distributor willing to move his product into stores. "I think they're afraid of pressure from the major cigarette manufacturers".

See also Death cigarettes  (by BJ Cunningham) sold in England from 1991-1999.

Personal life
Southwood was married to Anick, a University teacher and had two children a son, Chris and a daughter Amelie.

Filmography

References

External links

American male film actors
Male Spaghetti Western actors
American expatriates in Italy
1937 births
2009 deaths
Oregon State University alumni
Male actors from Oregon
20th-century American male actors